John Marion Raymundo Wilson (born January 18, 1987) is a Filipino professional basketball player for the Davao Occidental Tigers of the Pilipinas Super League (PSL).

Professional career
Wilson was drafted by Barangay Ginebra Kings seventh overall in the 2010 PBA draft.

On August 23, 2012, Wilson was traded to the Air21 Express. The trade was a part of a three team trade that involved Barangay Ginebra, Air21, and San Miguel Beermen.

On July 17, 2013, he, along with Nonoy Baclao, were traded Air21 to the Meralco Bolts in exchange for Carlo Sharma and Vic Manuel.

On May 22, 2015, he was traded by Meralco to GlobalPort Batang Pier in exchange for Kelly Nabong and then he shipped to the NLEX Road Warriors in exchange for NLEX's 2016 second round pick.

PBA career statistics

As of the end of 2017–18 season

Season-by-season averages

|-
| align=left | 
| align=left | Barangay Ginebra
| 33 || 14.3 || .412 || .364 || .588 || 2.9 || .8 || .3 || .1 || 5.3
|-
| align=left | 
| align=left | Barangay Ginebra
| 30 || 9.7 || .281 || .172 || .875 || 1.5 || .6 || .2 || .1 || 2.1
|-
| align=left | 
| align=left | Air21 / Meralco
| 43 || 20.4 || .412 || .331 || .670 || 3.6 || 1.1 || .6 || .2 || 8.3
|-
| align=left | 
| align=left | Meralco
| 31 || 19.5 || .434 || .359 || .680 || 3.9 || 1.3 || .7 || .2 || 8.5
|-
| align=left | 
| align=left | Meralco / NLEX
| 35 || 18.7 || .359 || .311 || .811 || 2.9 || 1.7 || .9 || .0 || 5.9
|-
| align=left | 
| align=left | NLEX / Phoenix
| 13 || 11.5 || .424 || .361 || .333 || 1.5 || .5 || .2 || .2 || 4.9
|-
| align=left | 
| align=left | Phoenix
| 28 || 10.1 || .385 || .333 || .714 || 2.0 || .3 || .4 || .0 || 4.0
|-
| align=left | 
| align=left | Barangay Ginebra
| 5 || 4.6 || .000 || .000 || 1.000 || .4 || .0 || .0 || .0 || .4
|-class=sortbottom
| align=center colspan=2 | Career
| 218 || 13.6 || .338 || .279 || .709 || 2.3 || .8 || .5 || .1 || 4.9

References

1987 births
Living people
Air21 Express players
Barangay Ginebra San Miguel players
Basketball players from Rizal
Filipino men's basketball players
Maharlika Pilipinas Basketball League players
Meralco Bolts players
JRU Heavy Bombers basketball players
NLEX Road Warriors players
Phoenix Super LPG Fuel Masters players
Shooting guards
Barangay Ginebra San Miguel draft picks